Armando Alonso Rodríguez (born 21 March 1984 in San José) is a Costa Rican professional footballer who used to play for Alajuelense.  Alonso scored a goal in the CONCACAF Champions' Cup 2008 quarter-final match against Atlante F.C. on March 19, 2008.

Club career
Alonso made his debut in the Costa Rican Premier Division on 20 February 2002 for Deportivo Saprissa against Santos de Guápiles. He then spent two years on loan at Cartaginés and joined Alajuelense in 2012 after being released along with Esteban Sirias by Saprissa in December 2011.

International career
He played in the 2001 FIFA U-17 World Championship finals in Trinidad and Tobago.

Alonso made his senior debut for Costa Rica in a March 2008 friendly match against Peru and has earned a total of 21 caps, scoring 3 goals. He has represented his country in 13 FIFA World Cup qualification matches and played at the 2009 CONCACAF Gold Cup and the 2011 Copa América.

His final international was a September 2010 friendly against Jamaica.

Career statistics

International goals
Scores and results list. Costa Rica's goal tally first.

References

External links
 
 Profile - Alajuelense
 Profile at Nacion.com 

1984 births
Living people
Footballers from San José, Costa Rica
Association football forwards
Association football wingers
Costa Rican footballers
Costa Rica international footballers
2009 CONCACAF Gold Cup players
2014 Copa Centroamericana players
Deportivo Saprissa players
C.S. Cartaginés players
L.D. Alajuelense footballers
Liga FPD players
Copa Centroamericana-winning players